The 1997 Men's European Volleyball Championship Qualification was the qualifying event for the 20th edition of the event, hosted in Eindhoven and Den Bosch, The Netherlands from 6 September to 14 September 1997, and organised by Europe's governing volleyball body, the European Volleyball Confederation. The qualifying matches were played in 1996 and 1997. The Netherlands qualified as hosts while Italy, Yugoslavia, Bulgaria and Russia automatically qualified from the 1995 edition of the Men's European Volleyball Championship. The five group winners and two teams from promotion round qualified for the 1997 edition.

Qualification summary
Qualified teams

Hosts

Directly qualified after 1995 edition

Qualified through qualification
Group A: 
Group B: 
Group C: 
Group D: 
Group E: 
Qualified through promotion round

Groups round
All games were played in home/away basis.

Group A

|}

|}

Group B

|}

|}

Group C

|}

|}

Group D

|}

|}

Group E

|}

|}

Promotion round
Venue:  Vienna, Austria
 added as a host to qualified teams.

All times are local

Group F

|}

|}

Semifinals

|}

Third place game

|}

Final

|}

Final standing

References
 Results

Q
E
E
Qualification for volleyball competitions